Mintiu (from Hungarian Németi, "Germans") may refer to several places in Romania:

Mintiu, a former city incorporated in 1715 into what is now Satu Mare city, Satu Mare County
Mintiu, a village in Nimigea Commune, Bistriţa-Năsăud County
Mintiu Gherlii, a commune in Cluj County
Mintia, a village in Vețel Commune, Hunedoara County